Camrose was a federal electoral district in Alberta, Canada, that was represented in the House of Commons of Canada from 1925 to 1953.

This riding was created in 1924 from parts of Battle River and Victoria ridings.

It was abolished in 1953 when it was redistributed into Acadia, Battle River—Camrose, Edmonton—Strathcona, Red Deer and Vegreville ridings.

Election results

See also 

 List of Canadian federal electoral districts
 Past Canadian electoral districts

External links 
 

Former federal electoral districts of Alberta